Jordan High School is a public high school in Long Beach, California. It is part of the Long Beach Unified School District.

The school is named in honor of David Starr Jordan, the founding president of Stanford University, a noted educator and a leader in field of eugenics who had died just two years before the school first opened in 1934. A century later, there has been many calls for the school to break its association with Dr. Jordan by having the school be renamed.

Overview
Jordan High School comprises two campuses. The main campus serves students from grades 10-12 and select 9th graders in special programs. The second campus, known as the Jordan Freshman Academy, was constructed in 2001 and serves the incoming 9th grade students. Referred to as "The Freshman Academy" or "Baby Jordan" by students, it is located at the site of the former Dominguez Mercy Hospital at 171 W. Bort Street, Long Beach, California. Jordan Freshmen Academy then had its final year for the group of 2011-2012. Starting from late 2012, Jordan Freshmen Academy became known as, "J Plus[+] or Jordan Plus[+]". Jordan Plus became the campus available to failing students, or students with a low GPA.

Major Renovation
Jordan High School had a major renovation from late 2014 to late 2018. It took three and a half years to remodel the school.

Smaller Learning Communities
Jordan is divided into smaller learning communities:

 Jordan's Media and Communication (JMAC)
 International Baccalaureate Magnet (IB)
 Academy of Architecture, Construction, and Engineering (ACE)
 Aspiration in Medical Services (AIMS)
 Law, Emergency and Public Service (LEAPS)

College admissions

The Class of 2021 spans throughout California within the California State University and University of California system, although alumni especially committed to universities in Southern California. The most popular destinations within both systems are Long Beach State (47 alumni), Cal State Dominguez Hills (20 alumni), UCLA (4 alumni), Cal State LA (3 alumni), UC San Diego (3 alumni), and UC Santa Barbara (3 alumni). Long Beach Jordan graduates are granted two years of free tuition at Long Beach City College, which has a dedicated Transfer Admission Guarantee resource center for transferring to the majority of UC and CSU Campuses. Admissions at private universities and out of state public universities are sparse, but enrollments have occurred at Lane College, Washington, and Arizona State. Below are admissions tables derived from the University of California and California State University for the Class of 2021:

Athletics
Jordan belongs in CIF-SS Div I.

Notable alumni

References

External links

 Official Jordan High School website

High schools in Long Beach, California
Public high schools in California
1934 establishments in California
Educational institutions established in 1934
Sumner Hunt buildings
PWA Moderne architecture in California